Camillo Michael Gonsalves (born 12 June 1972) is a Vincentian politician, lawyer and diplomat.  Gonsalves is the current Minister of Finance, Economic Planning and Information Technology of Saint Vincent and the Grenadines as well as the current representative for the constituency of East St. George.

Early life and education
Gonsalves was born on 12 June 1972 in Philadelphia to Ralph E. Gonsalves, current Prime Minister of St. Vincent and the Grenadines, and his then-wife Sonia V. Gonsalves, Professor of Psychology at Stockton University. 

Gonsalves obtained a Bachelor of Arts degree in journalism from Temple University in Philadelphia, and then a Juris Doctor from George Washington University Law School in Washington DC. He also has a Master of Science degree in Global Affairs from New York University.

Career and politics
Gonsalves worked as a journalist in Philadelphia before graduating from law school, and then worked as a corporate litigation attorney in Washington, DC. He subsequently worked as a Senior Crown Counsel for the government of Saint Vincent and the Grenadines, before being appointed to diplomatic postings "in various capacities in Cuba, Venezuela, Ethiopia, South Korea, Libya and throughout the CARICOM region".

In November 2007, Gonsalves became St. Vincent and the Grenadines' Permanent Representative to the United Nations, replacing Ambassador Margaret Hughes-Ferrari. 

In September 2013, Gonsalves was appointed as a senator in the House of Assembly of St. Vincent and the Grenadines, and renounced his U.S. citizenship prior to taking up the position. He was appointed Minister of Foreign Affairs, Foreign Trade, Consumer Affairs and Information Technology.

In the December 2015 elections, Gonsalves was elected to the House of Assembly after successfully contesting the seat for the constituency of East St. George. On 14 December 2015, he was sworn in as Minister of Economic Planning, Sustainable Development, Industry, Trade, Information and Labour.

In a surprise cabinet reshuffle which took effect on 10 November 2017, Gonsalves took on the responsibility of the finance ministry - a portfolio his father had held since his Unity Labour Party administration came to government in 2001 - becoming Minister of Finance, Economic Planning and Sustainable Development.

Gonsalves was re-elected for a second consecutive term in the 5 November 2020 elections and was sworn in as Minister of Finance, Economic Planning and Information Technology on 10 November 2020.

References

External links

 Ambassador Camillo Gonsalves presents the report of Saint Vincent and the Grenadines at the United Nations Human Rights Council's Universal Periodic Review, May 10, 2011 (video)

Temple University alumni
George Washington University Law School alumni
New York University alumni
Finance ministers of Saint Vincent and the Grenadines
Saint Vincent and the Grenadines diplomats
Saint Vincent and the Grenadines lawyers
Members of the House of Assembly of Saint Vincent and the Grenadines
Living people
Permanent Representatives of Saint Vincent and the Grenadines to the United Nations
1972 births
Children of national leaders
Foreign Ministers of Saint Vincent and the Grenadines
Saint Vincent and the Grenadines people of Portuguese descent
Saint Vincent and the Grenadines people of Jamaican descent